Shenzhen Eastern Bus Co., Ltd is a Chinese company that offers bus passenger transportation services in Shenzhen. Founded in 2007, it is one of the three major franchised bus companies in Shenzhen. Shenzhen Eastern Bus also provides car rental services and property leasing.

Operations
As of June 2022, Shenzhen Eastern Bus operates 292 bus routes, including 35 regular routes (routes without any English letters), 2 night shift routes (routes starting with N), 149 trunk bus routes (routes starting with M), 30 feeder bus and community microbus routes (routes starting with B), 32 express bus routes (routes starting with E), 11 holiday routes, and 33 rush hour routes, respectively, are operated by five branches under its jurisdiction.

See also
 Transport in Shenzhen
 List of bus routes in Shenzhen

References

External links
 Official Website

Transport in Shenzhen
Bus operating companies of China
Chinese companies established in 2007
Transport companies established in 2007